Daphnephila taiwanensis is a species of gall midges first associated with leaf galls on Lauraceae species, particularly Machilus thunbergii in Taiwan. Based on analysis on sequences of the mitochondrial cytochrome c oxidase subunit I, it has been suggested that in this genus, the stem-galling habit is a more ancestral state as opposed to the leaf-galling habit. This genus appears to have originated tropically and dispersed to Japan through Taiwan.

References

Further reading 
 
 "Differential contribution of antioxidants to antioxidative functions in galls evaluated by grey system theory." (2012).

External links 
 
 ADW

Diptera of Asia
Cecidomyiinae